Lyle Denniston (born March 16, 1931) is an American journalist, professor, and author who has reported on the Supreme Court of the United States since 1958. He wrote for SCOTUSblog, an online blog featuring news and analysis of the Supreme Court, until June 2016, after previously having written for multiple national newspapers and legal periodicals.  His commentary is also featured on the National Public Radio show Here and Now.  In addition, he has contributed to numerous books and journals, and is the author of "The Reporter and the Law: Techniques for Covering the Courts."  Denniston has taught classes on law, journalism, and American constitutional history at American University, Georgetown University, Penn State University, and Johns Hopkins University.

Biography
Lyle Denniston was born in Nebraska City, Nebraska. He graduated from University of Nebraska–Lincoln, and later earned a master's degree in political science and history from Georgetown University. While knowledgeable in legal affairs, Denniston is not a lawyer, though he taught at the Georgetown University Law Center for eight years. As a journalist he started covering the Supreme Court for the Wall Street Journal in 1958 during the Warren Court era, and later wrote for the Boston Globe, The Baltimore Sun, The American Lawyer, and the Washington Star. He joined SCOTUSblog in February 2004, and retired in June 2016—58 years after he first started covering the Supreme Court.

Because of his long-standing coverage of the Court, he has been referred to as the "Dean Emeritus of the Supreme Court Press Corps," and enjoys the singular distinction of being the only person to have earned a plaque in the Supreme Court press room.

Awards
 American Judicature Society's Toni House Journalism Award 
 Member of the Hall of Fame of the Society of Professional Journalists
 Outstanding News-Editorial Alumnus Award, University of Nebraska-Lincoln.

References

External links
scotusblog.com
lyldenlawnews.com

C-SPAN Q&A interview with Denniston, March 18, 2007

1931 births
20th-century American journalists
21st-century American journalists
American University faculty and staff
American bloggers
American legal scholars
American legal writers
American male bloggers
American male journalists
Georgetown College (Georgetown University) alumni
Georgetown University Law Center faculty
Johns Hopkins University faculty
Journalists from Nebraska
Living people
Pennsylvania State University faculty
People from Nebraska City, Nebraska
Supreme Court of the United States people
University of Nebraska–Lincoln alumni